"Flawless (Go to the City)" is a song co-written and performed by British singer George Michael and released by Sony BMG on 28 June 2004. It samples "Flawless" (2001), originally recorded by the electronic music band the Ones, which in turn samples "Keep on Dancin'" (1978), originally recorded by Gary's Gang, and Romeo and Juliet by Alec R. Costandinos. The song was taken from Michael's album Patience.

The single charted at  8 on the UK Singles Chart. It became a dance hit, especially in the United States, where it reached No. 1 on Billboards Hot Dance Club Songs chart.

Music video
The video which was co-conceived by George Michael with concept developer Andrew Trovaioli, begins with a man in his hotel room bathroom, urinating. As the occupant freshens up and as the song builds up to its main dance beat, several people of various ethnic groups also enter the room. The dancers begin to undress and re-dress themselves, all as if they have either just got out of the shower themselves, or come home from work. George Michael appears in the centre of the room, singing while seated on the bed. The camera zooms out to show the full hotel suite when the entire cast performs a brief, synchronized dance sequence. After this exchange, a hotel employee comes by the door with room service as the occupant is still dressing himself. The employee dances briefly as the occupant turns away to grab a pen to sign for the meal. As the song fades out, the dancers vacate when the occupant sits down to dinner in front of the television, with George Michael turning out the lights and leaving the room last.

Formats and track listings
UK CD single 1
 "Flawless (Go to the City)" (radio edit) – 4:50
 "Please Send Me Someone (Anselmo's Song)" (alternative version edit) – 5:02

UK CD single 2
 "Flawless (Go to the City)" (album version) – 6:51
 "Flawless (Go to the City)" (Jack 'N' Rory Vocal Mix) – 6:44
 "Flawless (Go to the City)" (Shapeshifters Remix) – 7:06
 "Flawless (Go to the City)" (Boxer Mix) – 5:56
 "Flawless (Go to the City)" (The Sharp Boys Hot Fridge Vocal Mix) – 8:03

Charts

Weekly charts

Year-end charts

Release history

See also
 List of number-one dance singles of 2004 (U.S.)

References

2004 singles
2004 songs
Epic Records singles
George Michael songs
Song recordings produced by George Michael
Songs written by George Michael
Sony Music UK singles